Animation is a method by which still figures are manipulated to appear as moving images. In traditional animation, images are drawn or painted by hand on transparent celluloid sheets to be photographed and exhibited on film. Today, many animations are made with computer-generated imagery (CGI). Computer animation can be very detailed 3D animation, while 2D computer animation (which may have the look of traditional animation) can be used for stylistic reasons, low bandwidth, or faster real-time renderings. Other common animation methods apply a stop motion technique to two- and three-dimensional objects like paper cutouts, puppets, or clay figures.

A cartoon is an animated film, usually a short film, featuring an exaggerated visual style. The style takes inspiration from comic strips, often featuring anthropomorphic animals, superheroes, or the adventures of human protagonists. Especially with animals that form a natural predator/prey relationship (e.g. cats and mice, coyotes and birds), the action often centers on violent pratfalls such as falls, collisions, and explosions that would be lethal in real life.

The illusion of animation—as in motion pictures in general—has traditionally been attributed to the persistence of vision and later to the phi phenomenon and beta movement, but the exact neurological causes are still uncertain. The illusion of motion caused by a rapid succession of images that minimally differ from each other, with unnoticeable interruptions, is a stroboscopic effect. While animators traditionally used to draw each part of the movements and changes of figures on transparent cels that could be moved over a separate background, computer animation is usually based on programming paths between key frames to maneuver digitally created figures throughout a digitally created environment.

Analog mechanical animation media that rely on the rapid display of sequential images include the phénakisticope, zoetrope, flip book, praxinoscope, and film. Television and video are popular electronic animation media that originally were analog and now operate digitally. For display on computers, technology such as the animated GIF and Flash animation were developed.

In addition to short films, feature films, television series, animated GIFs, and other media dedicated to the display of moving images, animation is also prevalent in video games, motion graphics, user interfaces, and visual effects.

The physical movement of image parts through simple mechanics—for instance, moving images in magic lantern shows—can also be considered animation. The mechanical manipulation of three-dimensional puppets and objects to emulate living beings has a very long history in automata. Electronic automata were popularized by Disney as animatronics.

Etymology
The word "animation" stems from the Latin "animātiōn", stem of "animātiō", meaning "a bestowing of life". The primary meaning of the English word is "liveliness" and has been in use much longer than the meaning of "moving image medium".

History

Before cinematography

Hundreds of years before the introduction of true animation, people all over the world enjoyed shows with moving figures that were created and manipulated manually in puppetry, automata, shadow play, and the magic lantern. The multi-media phantasmagoria shows that were very popular in European theatres from the late 18th century through the first half of the 19th century, featured lifelike projections of moving ghosts and other frightful imagery in motion.

In 1833, the stroboscopic disc (better known as the phénakisticope) introduced the principle of modern animation with sequential images that were shown one by one in quick succession to form an optical illusion of motion pictures. Series of sequential images had occasionally been made over thousands of years, but the stroboscopic disc provided the first method to represent such images in fluent motion and for the first time had artists creating series with a proper systematic breakdown of movements. The stroboscopic animation principle was also applied in the zoetrope (1866), the flip book (1868) and the praxinoscope (1877). A typical 19th-century animation contained about 12 images that were displayed as a continuous loop by spinning a device manually. The flip book often contained more pictures and had a beginning and end, but its animation would not last longer than a few seconds. The first to create much longer sequences seems to have been Charles-Émile Reynaud, who between 1892 and 1900 had much success with his 10- to 15-minute-long Pantomimes Lumineuses.

Silent era
When cinematography eventually broke through in 1895 after animated pictures had been known for decades, the wonder of the realistic details in the new medium was seen as its biggest accomplishment. Animation on film was not commercialized until a few years later by manufacturers of optical toys, with chromolithography film loops (often traced from live-action footage) for adapted toy magic lanterns intended for kids to use at home. It would take some more years before animation reached movie theaters.

After earlier experiments by movie pioneers J. Stuart Blackton, Arthur Melbourne-Cooper, Segundo de Chomón, and Edwin S. Porter (among others), Blackton's The Haunted Hotel (1907) was the first huge stop motion success, baffling audiences by showing objects that apparently moved by themselves in full photographic detail, without signs of any known stage trick.

Émile Cohl's Fantasmagorie (1908) is the oldest known example of a standard cinematographic film composed entirely of what became known as traditional (hand-drawn) animation. Other great artistic and very influential short films were created by Ladislas Starevich with his puppet animations since 1910 and by Winsor McCay with detailed drawn animation in films such as Little Nemo (1911) and Gertie the Dinosaur (1914).

During the 1910s, the production of animated "cartoons" became an industry in the US. Successful producer John Randolph Bray and animator Earl Hurd, patented the cel animation process that dominated the animation industry for the rest of the century. Felix the Cat, who debuted in 1919, became the first fully realized animal character in the history of American film animation.

American golden age
In 1928, Steamboat Willie, featuring Mickey Mouse and Minnie Mouse, popularized film with synchronized sound and put Walt Disney's studio at the forefront of the animation industry. Although Disney Animation's actual output relative to total global animation output has always been very small, the studio has overwhelmingly dominated the "aesthetic norms" of animation ever since. 

The enormous success of Mickey Mouse is seen as the start of the golden age of American animation that would last until the 1960s. The United States dominated the world market of animation with a plethora of cel-animated theatrical shorts. Several studios would introduce characters that would become very popular and would have long-lasting careers, including Walt Disney Productions' Goofy (1932) and Donald Duck (1934), Warner Bros. Cartoons' Looney Tunes characters like Porky Pig (1935), Daffy Duck (1937), Bugs Bunny (1938–1940), Tweety (1941–1942), Sylvester the Cat (1945), Wile E. Coyote and Road Runner (1949), Fleischer Studios/Paramount Cartoon Studios' Betty Boop (1930), Popeye (1933), Superman (1941) and Casper (1945), MGM cartoon studio's Tom and Jerry (1940) and Droopy, Walter Lantz Productions/Universal Studio Cartoons' Woody Woodpecker (1940), Terrytoons/20th Century Fox's Gandy Goose (1938), Dinky Duck (1939), Mighty Mouse (1942) and Heckle and Jeckle (1946) and United Artists' Pink Panther (1963).

Features before CGI

In 1917, Italian-Argentine director Quirino Cristiani made the first feature-length film El Apóstol (now lost), which became a critical and commercial success. It was followed by Cristiani's Sin dejar rastros in 1918, but one day after its premiere, the film was confiscated by the government.

After working on it for three years, Lotte Reiniger released the German feature-length silhouette animation Die Abenteuer des Prinzen Achmed in 1926, the oldest extant animated feature.

In 1937, Walt Disney Studios premiered their first animated feature, Snow White and the Seven Dwarfs, still one of the highest-grossing traditional animation features . The Fleischer studios followed this example in 1939 with Gulliver's Travels with some success. Partly due to foreign markets being cut off by the Second World War, Disney's next features Pinocchio, Fantasia (both 1940) and Fleischer Studios' second animated feature Mr. Bug Goes to Town (1941–1942) failed at the box office. For decades afterward, Disney would be the only American studio to regularly produce animated features, until Ralph Bakshi became the first to also release more than a handful features. Sullivan-Bluth Studios began to regularly produce animated features starting with An American Tail in 1986.

Although relatively few titles became as successful as Disney's features, other countries developed their own animation industries that produced both short and feature theatrical animations in a wide variety of styles, relatively often including stop motion and cutout animation techniques. Russia's Soyuzmultfilm animation studio, founded in 1936, produced 20 films (including shorts) per year on average and reached 1,582 titles in 2018. China, Czechoslovakia / Czech Republic, Italy, France, and Belgium were other countries that more than occasionally released feature films, while Japan became a true powerhouse of animation production, with its own recognizable and influential anime style of effective limited animation.

Television
Animation became very popular on television since the 1950s, when television sets started to become common in most developed countries. Cartoons were mainly programmed for children, on convenient time slots, and especially US youth spent many hours watching Saturday-morning cartoons. Many classic cartoons found a new life on the small screen and by the end of the 1950s, the production of new animated cartoons started to shift from theatrical releases to TV series. Hanna-Barbera Productions was especially prolific and had huge hit series, such as The Flintstones (1960–1966) (the first prime time animated series), Scooby-Doo (since 1969) and Belgian co-production The Smurfs (1981–1989). The constraints of American television programming and the demand for an enormous quantity resulted in cheaper and quicker limited animation methods and much more formulaic scripts. Quality dwindled until more daring animation surfaced in the late 1980s and in the early 1990s with hit series such as The Simpsons (since 1989) as part of a "renaissance" of American animation.

While US animated series also spawned successes internationally, many other countries produced their own child-oriented programming, relatively often preferring stop motion and puppetry over cel animation. Japanese anime TV series became very successful internationally since the 1960s, and European producers looking for affordable cel animators relatively often started co-productions with Japanese studios, resulting in hit series such as Barbapapa (The Netherlands/Japan/France 1973–1977), Wickie und die starken Männer/小さなバイキング ビッケ (Vicky the Viking) (Austria/Germany/Japan 1974), and The Jungle Book (Italy/Japan 1989).

Switch from cels to computers

Computer animation was gradually developed since the 1940s. 3D wireframe animation started popping up in the mainstream in the 1970s, with an early (short) appearance in the sci-fi thriller Futureworld (1976).

The Rescuers Down Under was the first feature film to be completely created digitally without a camera. It was produced in a style that's very similar to traditional cel animation on the Computer Animation Production System (CAPS), developed by The Walt Disney Company in collaboration with Pixar in the late 1980s.

The so-called 3D style, more often associated with computer animation, became the dominant technique following the release of Pixar's Toy Story (1995), the first computer-animated feature in this style.

Most of the cel animation studios switched to producing mostly computer animated films around the 1990s, as it proved cheaper and more profitable. Not only the very popular 3D animation style was generated with computers, but also most of the films and series with a more traditional hand-crafted appearance, in which the charming characteristics of cel animation could be emulated with software, while new digital tools helped developing new styles and effects.

Economic status
In 2010, the animation market was estimated to be worth circa US$80 billion. By 2020, the value had increased to an estimated US$270 billion. Animated feature-length films returned the highest gross margins (around 52%) of all film genres between 2004 and 2013. Animation as an art and industry continues to thrive as of the early 2020s.

Education, propaganda and commercials
The clarity of animation makes it a powerful tool for instruction, while its total malleability also allows exaggeration that can be employed to convey strong emotions and to thwart reality. It has therefore been widely used for other purposes than mere entertainment.

During World War II, animation was widely exploited for propaganda. Many American studios, including Warner Bros. and Disney, lent their talents and their cartoon characters to convey to the public certain war values. Some countries, including China, Japan and the United Kingdom, produced their first feature-length animation for their war efforts.

Animation has been very popular in television commercials, both due to its graphic appeal, and the humour it can provide. Some animated characters in commercials have survived for decades, such as Snap, Crackle and Pop in advertisements for Kellogg's cereals. Tex Avery was the producer of the first Raid "Kills Bugs Dead" commercials in 1966, which were very successful for the company.

Other media, merchandise and theme parks
Apart from their success in movie theaters and television series, many cartoon characters would also prove extremely lucrative when licensed for all kinds of merchandise and for other media.

Animation has traditionally been very closely related to comic books. While many comic book characters found their way to the screen (which is often the case in Japan, where many manga are adapted into anime), original animated characters also commonly appear in comic books and magazines. Somewhat similarly, characters and plots for video games (an interactive animation medium) have been derived from films and vice versa.

Some of the original content produced for the screen can be used and marketed in other media. Stories and images can easily be adapted into children's books and other printed media. Songs and music have appeared on records and as streaming media.

While very many animation companies commercially exploit their creations outside moving image media, The Walt Disney Company is the best known and most extreme example. Since first being licensed for a children's writing tablet in 1929, their Mickey Mouse mascot has been depicted on an enormous amount of products, as have many other Disney characters. This may have influenced some pejorative use of Mickey's name, but licensed Disney products sell well, and the so-called Disneyana has many avid collectors, and even a dedicated Disneyana fanclub (since 1984).

Disneyland opened in 1955 and features many attractions that were based on Disney's cartoon characters. Its enormous success spawned several other Disney theme parks and resorts. Disney's earnings from the theme parks have relatively often been higher than those from their movies.

Criticism
Criticism of animation has been common in media and cinema since its inception. With its popularity, a large amount of criticism has arisen, especially animated feature-length films. Criticisms regarding cultural representation and psychological effects on children have been raised around the animation industry, which some claim has remained politically unchanged and stagnant since its inception into mainstream culture.

Awards

As with any other form of media, animation has instituted awards for excellence in the field. Many are part of general or regional film award programs, like the China's Golden Rooster Award for Best Animation (since 1981). Awards programs dedicated to animation, with many categories, include ASIFA-Hollywood's Annie Awards, the Emile Awards in Europe and the Anima Mundi awards in Brazil.

Academy Awards

Apart from Academy Awards for Best Animated Short Film (since 1932) and Best Animated Feature (since 2002), animated movies have been nominated and rewarded in other categories, relatively often for Best Original Song and Best Original Score.

Beauty and the Beast was the first animated film nominated for Best Picture, in 1991. Up (2009) and Toy Story 3 (2010) also received Best Picture nominations, after the academy expanded the number of nominees from five to ten.

Production

The creation of non-trivial animation works (i.e., longer than a few seconds) has developed as a form of filmmaking, with certain unique aspects. Traits common to both live-action and animated feature-length films are labor intensity and high production costs.

The most important difference is that once a film is in the production phase, the marginal cost of one more shot is higher for animated films than live-action films. It is relatively easy for a director to ask for one more take during principal photography of a live-action film, but every take on an animated film must be manually rendered by animators (although the task of rendering slightly different takes has been made less tedious by modern computer animation). It is pointless for a studio to pay the salaries of dozens of animators to spend weeks creating a visually dazzling five-minute scene if that scene fails to effectively advance the plot of the film. Thus, animation studios starting with Disney began the practice in the 1930s of maintaining story departments where storyboard artists develop every single scene through storyboards, then handing the film over to the animators only after the production team is satisfied that all the scenes make sense as a whole. While live-action films are now also storyboarded, they enjoy more latitude to depart from storyboards (i.e., real-time improvisation).

Another problem unique to animation is the requirement to maintain a film's consistency from start to finish, even as films have grown longer and teams have grown larger. Animators, like all artists, necessarily have individual styles, but must subordinate their individuality in a consistent way to whatever style is employed on a particular film. Since the early 1980s, teams of about 500 to 600 people, of whom 50 to 70 are animators, typically have created feature-length animated films. It is relatively easy for two or three artists to match their styles; synchronizing those of dozens of artists is more difficult.

This problem is usually solved by having a separate group of visual development artists develop an overall look and palette for each film before the animation begins. Character designers on the visual development team draw model sheets to show how each character should look like with different facial expressions, posed in different positions, and viewed from different angles. On traditionally animated projects, maquettes were often sculpted to further help the animators see how characters would look from different angles.

Unlike live-action films, animated films were traditionally developed beyond the synopsis stage through the storyboard format; the storyboard artists would then receive credit for writing the film. In the early 1960s, animation studios began hiring professional screenwriters to write screenplays (while also continuing to use story departments) and screenplays had become commonplace for animated films by the late 1980s.

Techniques

Traditional

Traditional animation (also called cel animation or hand-drawn animation) was the process used for most animated films of the 20th century. The individual frames of a traditionally animated film are photographs of drawings, first drawn on paper. To create the illusion of movement, each drawing differs slightly from the one before it. The animators' drawings are traced or photocopied onto transparent acetate sheets called cels, which are filled in with paints in assigned colors or tones on the side opposite the line drawings. The completed character cels are photographed one-by-one against a painted background by a rostrum camera onto motion picture film.

The traditional cel animation process became obsolete by the beginning of the 21st century. Today, animators' drawings and the backgrounds are either scanned into or drawn directly into a computer system. Various software programs are used to color the drawings and simulate camera movement and effects. The final animated piece is output to one of several delivery media, including traditional 35 mm film and newer media with digital video. The "look" of traditional cel animation is still preserved, and the character animators' work has remained essentially the same over the past 90 years. Some animation producers have used the term "tradigital" (a play on the words "traditional" and "digital") to describe cel animation that uses significant computer technology.

Examples of traditionally animated feature films include Pinocchio (United States, 1940), Animal Farm (United Kingdom, 1954), Lucky and Zorba (Italy, 1998), and The Illusionist (British-French, 2010). Traditionally animated films produced with the aid of computer technology include The Lion King (US, 1994), The Prince of Egypt (US, 1998), Akira (Japan, 1988), Spirited Away (Japan, 2001), The Triplets of Belleville (France, 2003), and The Secret of Kells (Irish-French-Belgian, 2009).

Full
Full animation is the process of producing high-quality traditionally animated films that regularly use detailed drawings and plausible movement, having a smooth animation. Fully animated films can be made in a variety of styles, from more realistically animated works like those produced by the Walt Disney studio (The Little Mermaid, Beauty and the Beast, Aladdin, The Lion King) to the more 'cartoon' styles of the Warner Bros. animation studio. Many of the Disney animated features are examples of full animation, as are non-Disney works, The Secret of NIMH (US, 1982), The Iron Giant (US, 1999), and Nocturna (Spain, 2007). Fully animated films are often animated on "twos", sometimes on "ones", which means that 12 to 24 drawings are required for a single second of film.

Limited

Limited animation involves the use of less detailed or more stylized drawings and methods of movement usually a choppy or "skippy" movement animation. Limited animation uses fewer drawings per second, thereby limiting the fluidity of the animation. This is a more economic technique. Pioneered by the artists at the American studio United Productions of America, limited animation can be used as a method of stylized artistic expression, as in Gerald McBoing-Boing (US, 1951), Yellow Submarine (UK, 1968), and certain anime produced in Japan. Its primary use, however, has been in producing cost-effective animated content for media for television (the work of Hanna-Barbera, Filmation, and other TV animation studios) and later the Internet (web cartoons).

Rotoscoping

Rotoscoping is a technique patented by Max Fleischer in 1917 where animators trace live-action movement, frame by frame. The source film can be directly copied from actors' outlines into animated drawings, as in The Lord of the Rings (US, 1978), or used in a stylized and expressive manner, as in Waking Life (US, 2001) and A Scanner Darkly (US, 2006). Some other examples are Fire and Ice (US, 1983), Heavy Metal (1981), and Aku no Hana (Japan, 2013).

Live-action blending

Live-action/animation is a technique combining hand-drawn characters into live action shots or live-action actors into animated shots. One of the earlier uses was in Koko the Clown when Koko was drawn over live-action footage. Walt Disney and Ub Iwerks created a series of Alice Comedies (1923–1927), in which a live-action girl enters an animated world. Other examples include Allegro Non Troppo (Italy, 1976), Who Framed Roger Rabbit (US, 1988), Volere volare (Italy 1991), Space Jam (US, 1996) and Osmosis Jones (US, 2001).

Stop motion

Stop-motion animation is used to describe animation created by physically manipulating real-world objects and photographing them one frame of film at a time to create the illusion of movement. There are many different types of stop-motion animation, usually named after the medium used to create the animation. Computer software is widely available to create this type of animation; traditional stop-motion animation is usually less expensive but more time-consuming to produce than current computer animation.
 Puppet animation  Typically involves stop-motion puppet figures interacting in a constructed environment, in contrast to real-world interaction in model animation. The puppets generally have an armature inside of them to keep them still and steady to constrain their motion to particular joints. Examples include The Tale of the Fox (France, 1937), The Nightmare Before Christmas (US, 1993), Corpse Bride (US, 2005), Coraline (US, 2009), the films of Jiří Trnka and the adult animated sketch-comedy television series Robot Chicken (US, 2005–present).
 Puppetoon  Created using techniques developed by George Pal, are puppet-animated films that typically use a different version of a puppet for different frames, rather than manipulating one existing puppet.

 Clay animation or Plasticine animation  (Often called claymation, which, however, is a trademarked name). It uses figures made of clay or a similar malleable material to create stop-motion animation. The figures may have an armature or wire frame inside, similar to the related puppet animation (below), that can be manipulated to pose the figures. Alternatively, the figures may be made entirely of clay, in the films of Bruce Bickford, where clay creatures morph into a variety of different shapes. Examples of clay-animated works include The Gumby Show (US, 1957–1967), Mio Mao (Italy, 1974–2005), Morph shorts (UK, 1977–2000), Wallace and Gromit shorts (UK, as of 1989), Jan Švankmajer's Dimensions of Dialogue (Czechoslovakia, 1982), The Trap Door (UK, 1984). Films include Wallace & Gromit: The Curse of the Were-Rabbit, Chicken Run and The Adventures of Mark Twain.
 Strata-cut animation  Most commonly a form of clay animation in which a long bread-like "loaf" of clay, internally packed tight and loaded with varying imagery, is sliced into thin sheets, with the animation camera taking a frame of the end of the loaf for each cut, eventually revealing the movement of the internal images within.
 Cutout animation  A type of stop-motion animation produced by moving two-dimensional pieces of material paper or cloth. Examples include Terry Gilliam's animated sequences from Monty Python's Flying Circus (UK, 1969–1974); Fantastic Planet (France/Czechoslovakia, 1973); Tale of Tales (Russia, 1979), The pilot episode of the adult television sitcom series (and sometimes in episodes) of South Park (US, 1997) and the music video Live for the moment, from Verona Riots band (produced by Alberto Serrano and Nívola Uyá, Spain 2014).
 Silhouette animation  A variant of cutout animation in which the characters are backlit and only visible as silhouettes. Examples include The Adventures of Prince Achmed (Weimar Republic, 1926) and Princes et Princesses (France, 2000).
 Model animation  Stop-motion animation created to interact with and exist as a part of a live-action world. Intercutting, matte effects and split screens are often employed to blend stop-motion characters or objects with live actors and settings. Examples include the work of Ray Harryhausen, as seen in films, Jason and the Argonauts (1963), and the work of Willis H. O'Brien on films, King Kong (1933).
Go motion  A variant of model animation that uses various techniques to create motion blur between frames of film, which is not present in traditional stop motion. The technique was invented by Industrial Light & Magic and Phil Tippett to create special effect scenes for the film Star Wars: Episode V - The Empire Strikes Back (1980). Another example is the dragon named "Vermithrax" from the 1981 film Dragonslayer.
 Object animation  The use of regular inanimate objects in stop-motion animation, as opposed to specially created items.
 Graphic animation  Uses non-drawn flat visual graphic material (photographs, newspaper clippings, magazines, etc.), which are sometimes manipulated frame by frame to create movement. At other times, the graphics remain stationary, while the stop-motion camera is moved to create on-screen action.
 Brickfilm  A subgenre of object animation involving using Lego or other similar brick toys to make an animation. These have had a recent boost in popularity with the advent of video sharing sites, YouTube and the availability of cheap cameras and animation software.
 Pixilation  Involves the use of live humans as stop-motion characters. This allows for a number of surreal effects, including disappearances and reappearances, allowing people to appear to slide across the ground, and other effects. Examples of pixilation include The Secret Adventures of Tom Thumb and Angry Kid shorts, and the Academy Award-winning Neighbours by Norman McLaren.

Computer

Computer animation encompasses a variety of techniques, the unifying factor being that the animation is created digitally on a computer. 2D animation techniques tend to focus on image manipulation while 3D techniques usually build virtual worlds in which characters and objects move and interact. 3D animation can create images that seem real to the viewer.

2D

2D animation figures are created or edited on the computer using 2D bitmap graphics and 2D vector graphics. This includes automated computerized versions of traditional animation techniques, interpolated morphing, onion skinning and interpolated rotoscoping.
2D animation has many applications, including analog computer animation, Flash animation, and PowerPoint animation. Cinemagraphs are still photographs in the form of an animated GIF file of which part is animated.

Final line advection animation is a technique used in 2D animation, to give artists and animators more influence and control over the final product as everything is done within the same department. Speaking about using this approach in Paperman, John Kahrs said that "Our animators can change things, actually erase away the CG underlayer if they want, and change the profile of the arm."

3D

3D animation is digitally modeled and manipulated by an animator. The 3D model maker usually starts by creating a 3D polygon mesh for the animator to manipulate. A mesh typically includes many vertices that are connected by edges and faces, which give the visual appearance of form to a 3D object or 3D environment. Sometimes, the mesh is given an internal digital skeletal structure called an armature that can be used to control the mesh by weighting the vertices. This process is called rigging and can be used in conjunction with key frames to create movement.

Other techniques can be applied, mathematical functions (e.g., gravity, particle simulations), simulated fur or hair, and effects, fire and water simulations. These techniques fall under the category of 3D dynamics.

Terms
 Cel-shaded animation is used to mimic traditional animation using computer software. The shading looks stark, with less blending of colors. Examples include Skyland (2007, France), The Iron Giant (1999, United States), Futurama (1999, United States) Appleseed Ex Machina (2007, Japan), The Legend of Zelda: The Wind Waker (2002, Japan), The Legend of Zelda: Breath of the Wild (2017, Japan)
 Machinima – Films created by screen capturing in video games and virtual worlds. The term originated from the software introduction in the 1980s demoscene, as well as the 1990s recordings of the first-person shooter video game Quake.
 Motion capture is used when live-action actors wear special suits that allow computers to copy their movements into CG characters. Examples include Polar Express (2004, US), Beowulf (2007, US), A Christmas Carol (2009, US), The Adventures of Tintin (2011, US) kochadiiyan (2014, India)
 Computer animation is used primarily for animation that attempts to resemble real life, using advanced rendering that mimics in detail skin, plants, water, fire, clouds, etc. Examples include Up (2009, US), How to Train Your Dragon (2010, US)
 Physically based animation is animation using computer simulations.

Mechanical
 Animatronics is the use of mechatronics to create machines that seem animate rather than robotic.
 Audio-Animatronics and Autonomatronics is a form of robotics animation, combined with 3-D animation, created by Walt Disney Imagineering for shows and attractions at Disney theme parks move and make noise (generally a recorded speech or song). They are fixed to whatever supports them. They can sit and stand, and they cannot walk. An Audio-Animatron is different from an android-type robot in that it uses prerecorded movements and sounds, rather than responding to external stimuli. In 2009, Disney created an interactive version of the technology called Autonomatronics.
 Linear Animation Generator is a form of animation by using static picture frames installed in a tunnel or a shaft. The animation illusion is created by putting the viewer in a linear motion, parallel to the installed picture frames. The concept and the technical solution were invented in 2007 by Mihai Girlovan in Romania.
 Chuckimation is a type of animation created by the makers of the television series Action League Now! in which characters/props are thrown, or chucked from off camera or wiggled around to simulate talking by unseen hands.
 The magic lantern used mechanical slides to project moving images, probably since Christiaan Huygens invented this early image projector in 1659.

Other 

 Hydrotechnics: a technique that includes lights, water, fire, fog, and lasers, with high-definition projections on mist screens.
 Drawn on film animation: a technique where footage is produced by creating the images directly on film stock; for example, by Norman McLaren, Len Lye and Stan Brakhage.
 Paint-on-glass animation: a technique for making animated films by manipulating slow drying oil paints on sheets of glass, for example by Aleksandr Petrov.
 Erasure animation: a technique using traditional 2D media, photographed over time as the artist manipulates the image. For example, William Kentridge is famous for his charcoal erasure films, and Piotr Dumała for his auteur technique of animating scratches on plaster.
 Pinscreen animation: makes use of a screen filled with movable pins that can be moved in or out by pressing an object onto the screen. The screen is lit from the side so that the pins cast shadows. The technique has been used to create animated films with a range of textural effects difficult to achieve with traditional cel animation.
 Sand animation: sand is moved around on a back- or front-lighted piece of glass to create each frame for an animated film. This creates an interesting effect when animated because of the light contrast.
 Flip book: a flip book (sometimes, especially in British English, called a flick book) is a book with a series of pictures that vary gradually from one page to the next, so that when the pages are turned rapidly, the pictures appear to animate by simulating motion or some other change. Flip books are often illustrated books for children, they also are geared towards adults and employ a series of photographs rather than drawings. Flip books are not always separate books, they appear as an added feature in ordinary books or magazines, often in the page corners. Software packages and websites are also available that convert digital video files into custom-made flip books.
 Character animation
 Multi-sketching
 Special effects animation

See also

 Twelve basic principles of animation
 Animated war film
 Animation department
 Animated series
 Architectural animation
 Avar
 Independent animation
 International Animation Day
 International Animated Film Association
 International Tournée of Animation
 List of film-related topics
 Motion graphic design
 Society for Animation Studies
 Wire-frame model

References

Citations

Sources

Journal articles

Books

Online sources

External links

 The making of an 8-minute cartoon short
 "Animando", a 12-minute film demonstrating 10 different animation techniques (and teaching how to use them) (archived 1 October 2009).

 

 
Cartooning
Articles containing video clips
Film and video technology